Jerry Lee Carter (May 27, 1955 – August 3, 2021) was an American politician who served as a Republican member of the North Carolina House of Representatives, having been initially elected in 2018. He represented District 65, covering most of Rockingham County. He was the founder and pastor of Reidsville Baptist Church in Reidsville, North Carolina.

Carter died from complications of surgery at a hospital in Durham, North Carolina, on August 3, 2021, at age 66.

Electoral history

2020

2018

References

1955 births
2021 deaths
Republican Party members of the North Carolina House of Representatives
Baptists from North Carolina
People from Eden, North Carolina
Liberty University alumni
21st-century American politicians
20th-century Baptist ministers from the United States
21st-century Baptist ministers from the United States